Anitta, son of Pitḫana, reigned ca. 1740–1725 BC (middle chronology), and was a king of Kuššara, a city that has yet to be identified. He is the earliest known ruler to compose a text in the Hittite language.

His high official, or rabi simmiltim, was named Peruwa.

Biography 
Anitta, according to the middle chronology, reigned c. 1740–1725 BC, or alternatively in the 17th century BC (short chronology), and is the author of the Anitta text (CTH 1.A, edited in StBoT 18, 1974), the oldest known text in the Hittite language, also classified as "cushion-shaped" tablet KBo 3.22, being the oldest known text in an Indo-European language altogether. This text seems to represent a cuneiform record of Anitta's inscriptions at Kanesh, perhaps compiled by Hattusili I, one of the earliest Hittite kings of Hattusa. 

The Anitta text indicates that Anitta's father conquered Neša (Kanesh, Kültepe), which became an important city within the kingdom of Kuššara. During his own reign, Anitta defeated Huzziya, the last recorded king of Zalpuwa, and the Hattic king Piyusti and then conquered his capital at the site of the future Hittite capital of Hattusa. He then destroyed the city, sowed the ground with weeds, and laid a curse on the site.

Anitta's name appears on an inscription on a dagger found in Kültepe and also, together with the name of his father, on various Kültepe texts, as well as in later Hittite tradition.

See also

 History of the Hittites

Notes

External links
The Anitta text

Kültepe-dagger inscription
Reign of Anitta

Kings of Kussara
17th-century BC rulers